The second season of the reality television series Basketball Wives aired on VH1 from December 12, 2010 until March 14, 2011. The show was primarily filmed in Miami, Florida. It was executively produced by Nick Emmerson,
Alex Demyanenko, Shaunie O'Neal, Jill Holmes, Tom Huffman, and Sean Rankine.

The show chronicles the lives of a group of women who are the wives and girlfriends, or have been romantically linked to, professional basketball players in the National Basketball Association, though the title of the series does not make this differentiation, solely referring to the women as "wives".

Production
Basketball Wives debuted on April 11, 2010, with thirty-minute episodes. The second season premiered on December 12, 2010, with expanded sixty-minute episodes and featured new cast member Tami Roman. Season 3 made its debut on May 30, 2011, with new cast member Meeka Claxton. The fourth season premiered on February 20, 2012, with two new cast members, Kenya Bell and Kesha Nichols and the departure of Claxton. The fifth season premiered on August 19, 2013, with Tasha Marbury joining the cast. According to a tweet from Tami Roman, the show has been quietly though officially cancelled.

Cast

Main cast
  Royce Reed: Ex-Dancer for Miami/Orlando
 Suzie Ketcham: Ex-Girlfriend of Michael Olowokandi
 Tami Roman: Ex-Wife of Kenny Anderson
 Jennifer Williams: Wife of Eric Williams
 Evelyn Lozada: Ex-Fiancée of Antoine Walker
Shaunie O'Neal: Ex-Wife of Shaquille O’Neal

Recurring cast
Gloria Govan: Fiancée of Matt Barnes
Kim Russell: Wife of Bryon Russell
Ashley Walker: Mother of Rafer Alston’s child
 Juliannah ”Juli” Richmond: Wife of Mitch Richmond

Episodes

References

2010 American television seasons
2011 American television seasons
Basketball Wives